Tara Welch (née Silvestri) is an American professor of Classics at the University of Kansas. She has published two books, The Elegiac Cityscape: Propertius and the Meaning of Roman Monuments (2005) and Tarpeia: Workings of a Roman Myth (2015). She has also served as co-editor for the work Oxford Readings in Propertius (Oxford Readings in Classical Studies) (2012), along with Ellen Greene.

Welch received her bachelor's degree from University of Southern California in 1990, majoring in Latin and Greek. In 1989, she was chosen as a Rhodes Scholar. She earned a master's degree in 1993 from Oxford University and a Ph.D. from the University of California, Los Angeles in 1999.

While at USC, she was a member of Phi Beta Kappa and as well as the Mortar Board. Welch is currently a member of the Society for Classical Studies, Classical Association of the Middle West and South, the International Plutarch Society, and the Women's Classical Caucus.

Bibliography

 Co-Edited by Ellen Greene

References

American classical scholars
American Rhodes Scholars
Classical scholars of the University of Kansas
Living people
Place of birth missing (living people)
Scholars of Latin literature
University of California alumni
University of Kansas faculty
Women classical scholars
Year of birth missing (living people)